The Chicago Hounds are a professional rugby union team based near Chicago, Illinois, United States. The team was founded in 2022 as a Major League Rugby expansion franchise and is owned by Matt Satchwell and Phil Groves. Their home stadium is SeatGeek Stadium in Bridgeview, Illinois.

History

On November 17, 2022, Major League Rugby announced the Chicago Hounds as the newest expansion franchise to begin play in 2023, following the discontinuation of the MLR franchises in Austin and Los Angeles The Hounds will compete in the Western Conference of the MLR. Their first game will be against Old Glory DC on February 18, 2023.

Home field
The team is scheduled to play its home matches at the SeatGeek Stadium in Bridgeview, Illinois.

Players and personnel

Current squad

The Chicago Hounds squad for the 2023 Major League Rugby season is:

 Senior 15s internationally capped players are listed in bold.
 MLR teams are allowed to field up to ten overseas players per match.

Head coaches
 Sam Harris (2023–present)

Assistant coaches
 Adam Ashe, forwards coach (2023–present)
 Dave Clancy, attack, backs coach (2023–present)
 Jamie Beamish, Head of Performance (2023–present)

Captains
Bryce Campbell
Luke Beauchamp

Records

Season standings

2023 season
The Hounds will play 16 games in the 2023 season. Home games will be played at SeatGeek Stadium. The Hounds had their first ever regular season victory on March 18th against the Dallas Jackals.

References

External links
 

Major League Rugby teams
Rugby union teams in Illinois
Rugby union teams in Chicago
2022 establishments in Illinois
Rugby clubs established in 2022